The 1998 Furman Paladins football team was an American football team that represented Furman University as a member of the Southern Conference (SoCon) during the 1998 NCAA Division I-AA football season. In their fifth year under head coach Bobby Johnson, the Paladins compiled an overall record of 5–6, with a mark of 3–5 in conference play, finishing tied for sixth in the SoCon.

Schedule

References

Furman
Furman Paladins football seasons
Furman Paladins football